Cizara is a genus of moths in the family Sphingidae first described by Francis Walker in 1856.

Species
Cizara ardeniae (Lewin, 1805)
Cizara sculpta (R. Felder, 1874)

References

Macroglossini
Moth genera
Taxa named by Francis Walker (entomologist)